The 1900 South Bend Howard Park Club football team was an American football team that represented the South Bend Howard Park Club in the 1900 college football season.  The team compiled a 1–1 record, and were outscored by their opponents 64 to 11.

Schedule

Roster

 Huggard, left end, right guard
 Shirk, left end
 Zulkie, left tackle, left halfback
 Yank, left guard
 Shirley, center
 Howard, right guard, left guard
 Koehler, right tackle
 Hartman, right tackle
 Currey, right end
 Meyers, quarterback
 Vahlert, left halfback, right end
 Shoemaker, right halfback, right halfback
 Taylor, fullback
 Collins, fullback

References

South Bend Howard Park Club
South Bend Howard Park Club football seasons
South Bend Howard Park Club football